Bruno Fernandes (born 1994) is a Portuguese football midfielder playing for Manchester United.

Bruno Fernandes may also refer to:
Bruno Fernandes (footballer, born 1974), Portuguese former football midfielder
Bruno F. Fernandes (born 1978), Brazilian ophthalmologist and martial arts teacher
Bruno Fernandes (footballer, born 1978), Guinea-Bissauan former football defender
Bruno (footballer, born 1984), convicted murderer and Brazilian football goalkeeper
Bruno Fernando (born 1998), Angolan basketball player